The 1948 United States presidential election in Idaho took place on November 2, 1948, as part of the 1948 United States presidential election. State voters chose four representatives, or electors, to the Electoral College, who voted for president and vice president.

Franklin D. Roosevelt had carried Idaho in all four of his presidential runs, carrying the state by more than 20 points in 1932 and 1936, but by a narrower 9 points in 1940 and only 3.5 points in 1944. However, Oregon Senator Wayne Morse said that Dewey would fail to maintain these gains in the West if Bureau of Reclamation programs were cut as demanded by the House Appropriations Committee. Truman campaigned heavily in the West, including Idaho, arguing that the region was an economic colony of Wall Street under the GOP and that only the Democratic Party could give the region direct access to its natural resources. While in Pocatello, Truman also defended himself against charges of corruption by machine politics from his days in Kansas City.

Vote
Idaho was won by incumbent President Harry S. Truman (D–Missouri), running with Senator Alben W. Barkley, with 49.98% of the popular vote, against Governor Thomas Dewey (R–New York), running with Governor Earl Warren, with 47.26% of the popular vote.

This election marked the conclusion of Idaho's status as a swing state, as it would quickly become one of the most Republican states in the nation. Since this election, Idaho has supported a Democratic presidential nominee only once, Lyndon B. Johnson carried the state by 1.83 points in 1964, amidst a national Democratic landslide. Furthermore, other than Johnson, no Democrat except  John F. Kennedy in 1960 has won even 40% of the state's vote. Republicans would also score landslide wins in the 1950 state elections, This is the last election in which the southeastern Mormon counties of Bonneville, Bingham, Jefferson, Madison, Minidoka and Oneida (now known as  some of the most heavily Republican counties in the nation) voted for a Democratic presidential candidate.

Results

Results by county

See also
 United States presidential elections in Idaho

Notes

References

Idaho
1948
1948 Idaho elections